John Edward Linaker (14 January 1927 – 14 June 2013) was an English footballer.

Career
Linaker came to prominence during wartime football, during which he played for Everton as an amateur and Manchester City, who he joined in August 1945. After making no league appearances for City, he joined Southport in November 1946. He joined Nottingham Forest in September 1947, after making 15 appearances and scoring one goal in the league for Southport. He joined York City in June 1950 after making 15 appearances and scoring two goals in the league for Forest. His form for the club attracted attention and joined Hull City in October 1951, after making 63 appearances and scoring 16 goals for York. He made 26 appearances and scored three goals for Hull before re-joining York in May 1953. He joined non-league side Scarborough after making 40 appearances and scoring four goals for York in his second spell with the club. He returned to the Football League with Crewe Alexandra in July 1957. He joined Ashington after making 34 appearances and scoring three goals in the league for Crewe.

Notes

1927 births
2013 deaths
Footballers from Southport
English footballers
Association football wingers
Manchester City F.C. players
Southport F.C. players
Nottingham Forest F.C. players
York City F.C. players
Hull City A.F.C. players
Scarborough F.C. players
Crewe Alexandra F.C. players
Ashington A.F.C. players
Everton F.C. players